Jones Beach State Park (colloquially "Jones Beach") is a state park in the U.S. state of New York. It is located in southern Nassau County on Jones Beach Island, a barrier island linked to Long Island by the Meadowbrook State Parkway, Wantagh State Parkway, and Ocean Parkway. The park was created during Robert Moses' administration as President of the Long Island State Park Commission as part of the development of parkways on Long Island.

The park,  in length, is renowned for its beaches (which, excepting the beach on Zachs Bay, face the open Atlantic Ocean) and furnishes one of the most popular summer recreational locations for the New York metropolitan area. It is the most popular and heavily visited beach on the East Coast, with an estimated six million visitors per year.

Northwell Health at Jones Beach Theater, an outdoor arena in the park, is a popular musical and concert venue. The park also includes a  boardwalk. It once featured dining and catering facilities that were popular sites for private parties and weddings, though these have been shut down.

Jones Beach is named after Major Thomas Jones, a major in the Queens County militia in the 17th century, who established a whaling station on the outer beach near the site of the present park.

History

Jones Beach was Moses' first major public project, free from housing developments and private clubs, and instead is open for the general public. Several homes on High Hill Beach were barged further down the island to West Gilgo Beach to make room for the park.

Another problem that followed was the wind—the fine silver beach sand would blow horribly, making the workers miserable and making the use of the beach as a recreational facility unlikely. Moses sent landscape architects to other stable Long Island beaches, who reported that a beach grass (Ammophila breviligulata), whose roots grew sideways in search of water, held dunes in place, forming a barrier to the wind. In the summer of 1928, thousands of men worked on the beach planting the grass by hand.

Built in the 1920s, many of its buildings and facilities feature Art Deco architecture.  In the center of a traffic circle that he planned as a terminus for the Wantagh State Parkway, Moses ordered the construction of an Italianate-style water tower to serve as a central feature of the park. Two large bathhouses are also prominent features within the park. After rejecting a number of submissions by architects for the bathhouses, Moses selected the designs of the young and relatively inexperienced Herbert Magoon. Moses also picked out building materials—Ohio Sandstone and Barbizon brick—two of the most expensive materials available.

The park opened to the public on August 4, 1929, along with the causeway that provided automobile access from the mainland of Long Island. The causeway was the first section in what was to become the Wantagh State Parkway. Unusually for the time, no carnival-style amusements were allowed in the park area.

Moses used low clearances for the bridges over the Southern State Parkway, a major east-west route to Jones Beach. Even for earlier-built parkways in Westchester County that Moses used as inspiration, clearances are on average higher than on the Southern State. Public bus service was available from nearby Long Island Rail Road stations, and operated from opening day; various bus lines also operated service to Queens, Brooklyn, and Manhattan.

Since 2004, Jones Beach has hosted the Bethpage Air Show during the last weekend of May (Memorial Day weekend). The air show is one of the largest in the United States, and was attended by 231,000 people in 2015.

Park features and facilities

Ocean and bay beachfronts

Field 10 provides a place for fisherman, beach goers, and sunset watchers. Field 5, overlooking Zacks Bay, which was developed for still water bathing, and parking for the Jones Beach amphitheater is also a great option. (Outdated. Field 10 is now at the fishing pier on the bay side. See Google Map view. Field 10 on the ocean side of Ocean Parkway hasn't been around for at least half a century. Field 9 was closed decades ago.)

Buildings and entertainment facilities
The primary buildings on the Jones Beach site are the two enormous bathhouses (west and east) and the park's large water tower, all built to Moses' specifications. The  water tower, built in 1930 to resemble the bell tower of St Mark's Basilica in Venice, underwent a $6.1 million restoration in 2010.  Robert Moses' plan originally included two swimming pools available for public use at Jones Beach: The West Bath House pool and the East Bath House pool. While the West Bath House pool has remained open, budget constraints forced the closure of the East Bath House pool in 2009. As part of a $65 million refurbishment of the park announced in 2014, the West Bath House will receive $7 million in improvements; state officials have announced their desire to eventually rehabilitate the East Bath House as well.

Large mosaics on the Central Mall Walkway near the water tower were restored in 2015; the $177,000 mosaic restoration was part of a larger $65 million refurbishment of the park announced in 2014.

The park also includes the Jones Beach Boardwalk Bandshell, located near Parking Field 4, which offers live performances and free music.

 north of the beach, overlooking Zachs Bay, is the 15,200-seat Northwell Health at Jones Beach Theater, formerly known as the Jones Beach Marine Theater. This outdoor amphitheatre opened in 1952 and hosts numerous world-famous musicians during the summer months. It is directly across the street from the ocean and is outdoors in an open natural environment. It replaced a wooden structure built around 1930 which was destroyed by a disastrous hurricane in 1937.

A par 3 Pitch and Putt Course, advertised as "play[ing] differently each day, depending upon the prevailing winds", is located adjacent to the boardwalk and Atlantic Ocean. Basketball, paddle tennis, and shuffleboard facilities are also available.

Restaurants and concessions
There are multiple concession stands along the boardwalk in season. A few of the larger concessions stay open past the main summer season.  Beach dining and catering facilities no longer exist at Jones Beach.

Jones Beach formerly featured The Boardwalk Cafe, a large restaurant with an expansive ocean view, built in 1966 and demolished in 2004 due to damage from erosion. It was intended to be replaced with a $40 million, 1,500-seat,  restaurant/catering hall called "Trump on the Ocean", to be operated by then-real estate mogul (and later, President) Donald Trump and catering impresario Steven Carl. The project was stalled for several years due to legal battles over permits required for the restaurant's planned basement, and was eventually cancelled in the aftermath of Hurricane Sandy.

Field 10, overlooking the bay on the north side of the state park is home to four fishing piers as well as a fully stocked bait, tackle, and souvenir store. In 2020 during the Covid Pandemic, the facility at Field 10 opened “Jones Beach Beer Garden” outside dining which sells appetizer style food and a large category of non alcoholic and alcoholic local craft beers.

Jones Beach Energy & Nature Center

The Jones Beach Energy & Nature Center at Jones Beach State Park is a pioneering facility exploring how energy consumption shapes the natural environment. Located on the West End of Long Island’s iconic Jones Beach State Park, the Center activates the coastal landscape as a living example of these relationships. The net-zero building models how architecture, design, and technology can adapt to a changing environment to meet our energy needs. Through dynamic and accessible indoor and outdoor exhibits, educational programming, and public events, the Center showcases ways visitors can become conscientious environmental stewards and smart energy consumers

ADA accessible amenities
Jones Beach State Park offers numerous amenities, many of which meet the Americans with Disabilities Act accessibility standards. Examples of accessible amenities include:

Parking fields
Jones Beach's West End originally featured two parking fields known as West End 1, which was closed permanently in 1992 and replaced by the Theodore Roosevelt Nature Center after lying abandoned for nearly a decade, and West End 2, which lies at the westernmost area of the state park adjacent to the jetty on Jones' Inlet. West End 2 is currently a designated surfing area, which is open to stargazers and fisherman at night and bird watchers and other naturalists by day. The West End 2 beach was closed in April 2009 because of the state fiscal crisis. The West End 2 parking field along with the Field 1 are the two largest ocean front parking areas currently extant in the park.  During the COVID-19 pandemic, a drive thru testing site was established in the West End 1 parking field, resulting in the area being closed to all recreational activity until further notice.

Transportation

Jones Beach is accessible by car, boat, bicycle, and in the summer season by bus.  Most visitors arrive by car via the Meadowbrook State Parkway or the Wantagh State Parkway; the recreation area is also accessible via the Ocean Parkway.  A significant portion of visitors take the Long Island Rail Road (LIRR) to Freeport and then a bus to Jones Beach.

Boaters often anchor on the bay side of Jones Beach (i.e., Zachs Bay), especially at night during a show such as the fireworks show on July 4.

A similar route to Long Beach is under consideration.

As of 2016, parking costs $10.00 ($8.00 when the beach is closed), though a New York State Empire Passport ($65.00) can be used to park for free. Parking fees are charged from 6:00 a.m. to 6:00 p.m. on Saturdays, Sundays and holidays, and from 8:00 a.m. to 4:00 p.m. weekdays from Memorial Day through Columbus day. The six main public parking areas along the boardwalk can handle 14,302 vehicles. The center parking fields are the busiest on summer weekends.  Bicycle parking is free. Cars were formerly able to pay parking fees for all fields at staffed toll booths on the highways approaching the park, however as of 2017 fees are now paid through automated machines at the entrances to the fields.

References

External links

 New York State Parks: Jones Beach State Park
 Jones Beach Club - Organization dedicated to the park's preservation
 Long Island Traditions: Eastern Nassau: Jones Beach

Beaches of Nassau County, New York
State parks of New York (state)
Parks in Nassau County, New York
Robert Moses projects
National Register of Historic Places in Hempstead (town), New York
Urban public parks
Wantagh, New York
Historic districts on the National Register of Historic Places in New York (state)